Theodosia is a feminine given name of Greek origin meaning “giving to God”. It is a feminine version of the Greek name Theodosius. 

The name was most popular in the United States in the 1700s and 1800s and has been rare since. It has increased in use in recent years for American girls in part due to the popularity of the musical Hamilton, which features a song entitled "Dear Theodosia". The musical includes as characters fictionalized versions of the historical figures Aaron Burr and his daughter Theodosia Burr Alston.

People
Theodosia of Tyre, 3rd century Christian martyr
Theodosia of Constantinople, 7th–8th century Byzantine nun, martyr and saint of the Eastern Orthodox Church
Theodosia, wife of Leo V (c. 775–c. 826), Empress consort of Leo V the Armenian
Theda Bara (1885–1955), stage name of actress Theodosia Burr Goodman
Theodosia Burr Alston (1783–1813), daughter of U.S. Vice President Aaron Burr
Theodosia Burr Shepherd (1845-1906), American botanist
Theodosia Ann Dean (1819-1843), English missionary
Theodosia Harris (1877-1938), American screenwriter
Theodosia Ivie or Ivy (1629-1697), English adventuress
Theodosia Meade, Countess of Clanwilliam (1744–1817)
Theodosia Ntokou, classical pianist
Theodosia Okoh (1922-2015), Ghanaian stateswoman and teacher known for designing the national flag of Ghana
Anne Steele (1717-1778), English poet and hymn writer who published under the pseudonym Theodosia
Theodosia Stirling (1815-1904), Australian actor and singer

Fictional characters
Theodosia Burr Alston, in the book My Theodosia by Anya Seton 
Theodosia Throckmorton, main character in Theodosia and the Serpents of Chaos, a children's novel by R.L. LaFevers
The television series based on the novel
Theodosia, from the play The Royal Master by James Shirley

Notes